Reva Rice is an American musical theatre actress and singer, best known for originating the role of Pearl in Starlight Express on Broadway, and subsequently playing the role in the London production after its 1992 revision as well as on tour in the US and in Las Vegas.

Her other credits include Velma in Chicago, Smokey Joe's Cafe and the television show The Watcher. She played Roz in the world premiere production of JAM: Just Another Man, a musical about the life of Clint Holmes, at the Judy Bayley Theatre at the University of Nevada, Las Vegas. More recently she was the standby for The Lady of the Lake in the Las Vegas production of Spamalot and took part in the Las Vegas tryout of the new musical, All In: The Poker Musical.

She performed in the ensemble of the US national tour of the musical version of The Color Purple, understudying the lead character Shug Avery. She performed in David Saxe's Vegas! The Show, at the Saxe Theater at the Planet Hollywood Resort and Casino.

Rice led the cast in the Japanese production of Fosse, based on the work of choreographer Bob Fosse. She was also one of the finalists on the television show Star Search.

Reva Las Vegas is a 90-minute revue based upon her career from Broadway to Las Vegas.

In June 2018, Rice returned to Starlight Express playing Mama, a female version of Poppa, in the Bochum production.

Background
Rice was born in Toledo, Ohio to Flute and Pearl Esterine Shields Rice. She began training in dance, theatre, and piano at the age of five, and later graduated from the Boston Conservatory of Music.

Theatre credits
 Pearl the Observation Car in Starlight Express (Broadway)
 Pearl the Observation Car in Starlight Express (London)
 Velma Kelly in Chicago
 Roz in JAM: Just Another Man
 The Lady of the Lake (Standby) in Monty Python's Spamalot (Las Vegas)
 Lead Singer in VEGAS! THE SHOW
 Mama the Old Steamer in Starlight Express (Bochum)

Single
In 1993, The New Starlight Express, a cast recording of the revised London production was released featuring Rice as Pearl. As well as singing the solos "Make Up My Heart" and "He'll Whistle At Me", Rice duets on "Next Time You Fall in Love" with Greg Ellis. The track was released as a single.

External links

References

Living people
21st-century American actresses
21st-century American women singers
21st-century American singers
Actresses from Toledo, Ohio
American musical theatre actresses
Boston Conservatory at Berklee alumni
Musicians from Toledo, Ohio
Year of birth missing (living people)